Rainy River can refer to:

 Rainy River (British Columbia), a short river that flows into the Howe Sound
 Rainy River (Marlborough), a tributary of the Pelorus River, Marlborough District, New Zealand
 Rainy River (Michigan), tributary of the Black River
 Rainy River (Minnesota–Ontario), part of the United States-Canada border between Minnesota and Ontario
 Rainy River (Tasman), a river in the Motueka River catchment, Tasman District, New Zealand
 Rainy River, Ontario
 Rainy River First Nations, an Ojibway First nation in Northwest Ontario
 Rainy River District